The 5th National Assembly of the Federal Republic of Nigeria was a bicameral legislature inaugurated on 3 June 2003 and ran its course till 5 June 2007.
The assembly comprises the Senate and the House of Representatives. 360 representatives were elected as member of the House of Representative while 109 members were elected as member of the senate, making a total of 469 members all together across the six geopolitical zones.

Members

Senate
 President of the Senate of Nigeria: Adolphus Wabara (PDP), until 5 April 2005
 Ken Nnamani (PDP), from 5 April 2005

House of Representatives 
 Speaker: Aminu Bello Masari (PDP)

Presiding officers
The Senate President presides over the Senate, the higher chamber while the Speaker presides over the House of Representatives.
Adolphus Wabara was elected as Senate President on the platform of the People's Democratic Party and Aminu Bello Masari, the Speaker of the House of Representatives succeeded Ghali Umar Na'Abba, the speaker of the 4th Assembly.

References

External links 

 Official website of the Nigerian National Assembly 
 Assemblyonline news on the National Assembly
 Official People and Legislature Information Interchange

Politics of Nigeria
5th
Nigeria
2003 in Nigeria
2004 in Nigeria
2005 in Nigeria
2006 in Nigeria
2007 in Nigeria